"The Ballad of Bilbo Baggins" is a song composed by Charles Randolph Grean and performed by Leonard Nimoy, telling the story of Bilbo Baggins and his adventures in J. R. R. Tolkien's 1937 novel The Hobbit. The recording was featured on the 1968 album Two Sides of Leonard Nimoy, the second of Nimoy's albums on Dot Records. It was also released as a single (Dot Records Cat. #45-17028) in July 1967, backed with a "modern thought-image" folk song called "Cotton Candy".

When the single was originally released, Nimoy lip-synched to the recording during a guest appearance on the July 28, 1967 episode of Malibu U, a short-lived variety television series. This segment survives as a "music video" and shows Nimoy (wearing his Star Trek hairstyle as the series was in the midst of production of its second season at the time) and a group of color-coordinated young women, all wearing plastic pointed ears (presumably like Vulcans as Hobbits only had slightly pointed ears in Tolkien's writing), singing and dancing an overtly strange, hopping-waddling dance on a beach. Clothing and random objects would fly up from behind a hill, and a variety of buttons with typical Hobbit/Star Trek slogans ("Hobbits Unite!", "Admit Middle-earth to the U.N.!", "What's a Leonard Nimoy?") were occasionally visible. 

Since its rediscovery on the BBC2 documentary Funk Me Up Scotty and propagation over the Internet, it has been treated as an example of 1960s camp. An excerpt from the musical number is included in the documentaries Ringers: Lord of the Fans about The Lord of the Rings fandom, and in For the Love of Spock. The song was also included in the 1993 Nimoy compilation album Highly Illogical.

References to the song 
An audio clip of the song was played as part of an answer on an episode of Jeopardy! aired January 5, 2006. The song was sampled by Bentley Rhythm Ace for their track "Theme From 'Gutbuster'" on their album For Your Ears Only, released in 2000. Segments of the song were shown during Bring Back... Star Trek, with Justin Lee Collins citing it as research into Leonard Nimoy.

Nimoy recites the song's first verse in a 2013 Audi advertisement, where he engages in rivalry with another actor who also played Spock, Zachary Quinto.

References

Music based on Middle-earth
Songs about fictional male characters
Songs written by Charles Randolph Grean
Leonard Nimoy songs
1967 songs
1967 singles
Works based on The Hobbit